Parthiban Kanavu ( Parthiban's Dream) is a 2003 Indian Tamil-language magical realism romantic drama film written and directed by debutante Karu Pazhaniappan, an assistant to Parthiban. The film stars Srikanth and Sneha, where the latter plays a dual role. It had Manivannan and Vivek in supporting roles. The film's score and soundtrack are composed by Vidyasagar.  The film released on 16 May 2003 and became a major success.

This movie was remade in Telugu as Ammayi Bagundi.

Plot
Parthiban is a marketing executive who loves spending time with his friends. Parthiban's parents want him to get married but he does not believe in arranged marriage and waits to see a girl as per his likes and dislikes. One day, Parthiban is attracted to a girl he sees. He follows her and finds her office location. Everyday Parthiban sees her while she is on the way to her office. Also, Parthiban gets to know that her taste and interests match with him and starts to love her.

Meanwhile, Parthiban's parents decide to get him married to Sathya and force him to meet her. Parthiban goes to meet the girl without any interest. But to his surprise, the girl is the same person whom he was following for a few days and learns that her name is Sathya. Parthiban feels happy that he is about to marry the same girl whom he was secretly in love.

Parthiban and Sathya get married. On the way back to their home, Parthiban finds the girl in the same place where he sees her before daily. He is surprised to learn that Sathya is the look alike of the girl whom he loved. Parthiban visits the girl's office and enquires about her. He learns that the other girl's name is Janani and she has come for a project temporarily. Also Parthiban starts maintaining his distance from Sathya as he finds that her interests are different from his.

Sathya is more responsible person of the two and she understands that her husband is confused and tolerates his behaviour. Parthiban's friend Mano advises him to accept Sathya as his wife and to forget Janani. Slowly, Parthiban starts understanding his wife Sathya. But to everyone's surprise, Janani moves into a flat opposite to Parthiban's. Sathya meets Janani and is surprised to see her look alike.

Everyone from Sathya's family comes to meet Janani and is surprised. Janani is easygoing. Parthiban does not disclose that he knew Janani before and starts befriending her. Mano understands that Parthiban is slowly moving away from his wife Sathya and is getting attracted towards Janani. So he plans to reveal everything to Janani, so that she will leave the place.
Mano meets Sathya and misunderstands her as Janani (as Sathya always wears saree while Janani is in modern attire). Without knowing that it is Sathya, Mano reveals all the truth about Parthiban's secret love towards Janani and requests her to vacate the place, so that Parthiban can lead a happy life with Sathya. Mano is shocked to know that it was Sathya and not Janani.

Sathya cries and leaves to her parents' home. Janani wants Parthiban to meet in a temple. Janani asks about his love towards her. But Parthiban replies that he loved her before and once when he got to know about his wife Sathya's true love towards him, he changed his mind. He also says that he will wait until Sathya changes her mind and returns to live with him. But now, it is Sathya in disguise of Janani and the meeting plan was set by Janani. Sathya feels happy hearing her husband praising her. Parthiban and Sathya lives happily while Janani vacates her flat wishing them good luck.

Cast

Soundtrack
Songs composed by Vidyasagar.

Reception 
The Hindu gave the film a favorable review and noted that "It is not often that you get to see a wholesome film". Sify opined that "This film is infinitely more watchable than the recent crop of mindless love stories".

Awards

Tamil Nadu State Film Awards-2003

Best Film
Best Director- Karu Palaniappan
Best Actor- Srikanth
Best Comedian (male) - Vivek
Best Comedian (female) - Devadarshini
Best Lyrics – Kabilan
Best Playback Singer (female) - Harini

References

External links 

2003 films
Indian romantic drama films
2000s Tamil-language films
Films scored by Vidyasagar
Films directed by Karu Pazhaniappan
2003 romantic drama films